This is a list of aircraft in alphabetical order beginning with 'Y'.

Y

Y2Fly
(Point Harbor, North Carolina, United States)
Y2Fly Seahawk

Yackey Aircraft Co. 
 Yackey A
 Yackey Sport
 Yackey BRL-12
 Yackey Transport
 Yackey Cruiser
 Yackey Scout
 Yackey Monoplane

Yager
(Karl Yager)
 Yager KY-01
 Yager KY-02
 Yager KY-03 Libellula

Yakovlev 

 Yakovlev AIR-1
 Yakovlev AIR-2
 Yakovlev AIR-3
 Yakovlev AIR-4
 Yakovlev AIR-5
 Yakovlev AIR-6 (1930)
 Yakovlev AIR-6
 Yakovlev AIR-7
 Yakovlev AIR-8
 Yakovlev AIR-9
 Yakovlev AIR-10 (1934)
 Yakovlev AIR-10
 Yakovlev AIR-11
 Yakovlev AIR-12
 Yakovlev AIR-13
 Yakovlev AIR-14
 Yakovlev AIR-15
 Yakovlev AIR-16
 Yakovlev AIR-17
 Yakovlev AIR-18
 Yakovlev Ya-19
 Yakovlev Ya-20
 Yakovlev Ya-21
 Yakovlev Ya-22
 Yakovlev BB-22
 Yakovlev EG
 Yakovlev LT-1
 Yakovlev LT-2
 Yakovlev Sh
 Yakovlev UT-1
 Yakovlev UT-2
 Yakovlev UT-3
 Yakovlev UT-21
 Yakovlev Yak-1
 Yakovlev Yak-2
 Yakovlev Yak-3
 Yakovlev Yak-4
 Yakovlev Yak-5
 Yakovlev Yak-6
 Yakovlev Yak-7
 Yakovlev Yak-8
 Yakovlev Yak-9
 Yakovlev Yak-10
 Yakovlev Yak-11
 Yakovlev Yak-12
 Yakovlev Yak-13
 Yakovlev Yak-14
 Yakovlev Yak-15
 Yakovlev Yak-16
 Yakovlev Yak-17
 Yakovlev Yak-17-RD10 one off prototype, unrelated to above
 Yakovlev Yak-18
 Yakovlev Yak-18T
 Yakovlev Yak-19
 Yakovlev Yak-20
 Yakovlev Yak-21
 Yakovlev Yak-23
 Yakovlev Yak-24
 Yakovlev Yak-25 (1947) prototype single-engine interceptor of 1947
 Yakovlev Yak-25 twin-engine interceptor of 1952, produced in series
 Yakovlev Yak-26
 Yakovlev Yak-27
 Yakovlev Yak-28
 Yakovlev Yak-30 (1948)
 Yakovlev Yak-30 (1960)
 Yakovlev Yak-32
 Yakovlev Yak-33
 Yakovlev Yak-36
 Yakovlev Yak-38
 Yakovlev Yak-40
 Yakovlev Yak-41
 Yakovlev Yak-42
 Yakovlev Yak-43
 Yakovlev Yak-44
 Yakovlev Yak-45
 Yakovlev Yak-46
 Yakovlev Yak-50 (1949)
 Yakovlev Yak-50 (1975)
 Yakovlev Yak-52
 Yakovlev Yak-53
 Yakovlev Yak-54
 Yakovlev Yak-55
 Yakovlev Yak-58
 Yakovlev Yak-60
 Yakovlev Yak-77
 Yakovlev Yak-100
 Yakovlev Yak-104 (Yak-32)
 Yakovlev Yak-110
 Yakovlev Yak-112
 Yakovlev Yak-130
 Yakovlev Yak-140
 Yakovlev Yak-141
 Yakovlev Yak-142
 Yakovlev Yak-152
 Yakovlev Yak-200
 Yakovlev Yak-201
 Yakovlev Yak-210
 Yakovlev Yak-1000
 Yakovlev Yak-M11FR-1
 Hongdu Yakovlev CJ-7
 Yakovlev 104 (Yak-30)
 Yakovlev 120 (Yak-25)
 Yakovlev 121 (Yak-25)
 Yakovlev 122 (Yak-25)
 Yakovlev 123 (Yak-26)
 Yakovlev 125 (Yak-26)
 Yakovlev 129 (Yak-28)
 Yakovlev 140
 Yakovlev 200
 Yakovlev 210

Yasui 
(Yasui Hiko Kenkyusho - Yasui Flying Research Studio)
 Yasui TN-6 Kai
 Yasui No.3

Yates 
(George Yates, Beaverton, OR; St Helens, OR)
 Yates Gilbert Experimental
 Yates Oregon O
 Yates Stiper
 Greenwood-Yates Twin

Yatsenko 
 Yatsenko I-28

Yench'u
 Yench'u D-2
 Yench'u XP-1

Yeoman Aviation
 Yeoman YA-1 Cropmaster 250

Yermolayev 
 Yermolayev Yer-2

Yokosuka 
(Yokosuka First Naval Air Technical Arsenal (第一海軍航空技術廠))
(a.k.a. Kugisho and Yokosho)
 Yokosuka Experimental Japanese-Navy-Type Seaplane
 Yokosuka Experimental Kusho 6-shi Special Bomber (aka Tokushu Bakugekiki - Special Bomber), construction at Nakajima
 Yokosuka Experimental Kusho 8-shi Special Bomber (aka Tokushu Bakugekiki - Special Bomber)
 Yokosuka Experimental Kusho 12-shi Flying-boat
 Yokosuka Experimental Yokosho Nakajima Tractor Seaplane
 Yokosuka Experimental Yokosho Twin-engined Seaplane
 Yokosuka Experimental Yokosho Ho-go Otsu-gata Seaplane
 Yokosuka Experimental Yokosho Ho-go Small Seaplane
 Yokosuka Experimental Tatsu-go Reconnaissance Seaplane
 Yokosho-Type Reconnaissance Seaplane
 Yokosuka B3Y
 Yokosuka B4Y
 Yokosuka D2Y
 Yokosuka D3Y Myojo
 Yokosuka D4Y
 Yokosuka D5Y
 Yokosuka E1Y
 Yokosuka E5Y
 Yokosuka E6Y
 Yokosuka E14Y
 Yokosuka H5Y
 Yokosuka H7Y
 Yokosuka K1Y
 Yokosuka K2Y
 Yokosuka K4Y
 Yokosuka K5Y
 Yokosuka L3Y
 Yokosuka MXY1 (Built by Watanabe
 Yokosuka MXY2
 Yokosuka MXY3
 Yokosuka MXY4
 Yokosuka MXY5
 Yokosuka MXY6
 Yokosuka MXY7 Ohka
 Yokosuka MXY8 Akigusa
 Yokosuka MXY9 Shuka
 Yokosuka MXY10
 Yokosuka MXY11
 Yokosuka P1Y Ginga
Navy Bomber Ginga Ground Decoy
 Yokosuka R1Y Seiun - Blue cloud (Gyoun - Dawn cloud)
 Yokosuka R2Y Keiun - Beautiful Cloud
 Yokosuka Navy Short Reconnaissance Seaplane
 Yokosuka Ro-go Ko-gata, also known as "Yokosho-Type Reconnaissance Seaplane"
 Yokosuka Navy Yokosho I-go Ko-gata Seaplane Trainer
 Yokosuka Navy Yokosho 1-go Reconnaissance Seaplane
 Yokosuka Navy Yokosho 2-go Reconnaissance Seaplane
 Yokosuka Navy Yokosho 2-go Kai Reconnaissance Seaplane
 Yokosuka Navy F.5 Flying-boat - licence built Felixstowe F.5
 Yokosuka Navy No. 2 Reconnaissance Seaplane
 Yokosuka Navy Avro 504 Trainer - lience built Avro 504
 Yokosuka Navy Type Hansa Reconnaissance Seaplane
 Yokosuka Navy Ha-go Small Seaplane
 Yokosuka Navy Type Ka Seaplane
 Yokosuka Navy Type Mo Small Seaplane (Maurice Farman Hydro-Aeroplane II)
 Yokosuka Navy Type Mo Large Seaplane
 Yokosuka Navy Type 0 Small Reconnaissance Seaplane
 Yokosuka Navy Type 1 Attack Bomber Ground Decoy
 Yokosuka Navy Type 1 Target Aircraft
 Yokosuka Navy Type 2 Carrier Reconnaissance Aircraft
 Yokosuka Navy Type 3 Primary Trainer
 Yokosuka Navy Type 10 Reconnaissance Seaplane
 Yokosuka Navy Type 13 Trainer
 Yokosuka Navy Type 13 Training Seaplane
 Yokosuka Navy Type 14 Reconnaissance Seaplane
 Yokosuka Navy Type 14 Modified Transport Seaplane
 Yokosuka Navy Type 90 Reconnaissance Seaplane
 Yokosuka Navy Type 90 Training Seaplane
 Yokosuka Navy Type 91 Intermediate Trainer
 Yokosuka Navy Type 91-1 Reconnaissance Seaplane
 Yokosuka Navy Type 92 Carrier Attack Bomber
 Yokosuka Navy Type 93 Advanced Trainer
 Yokosuka Navy Type 93 Intermediate Trainer
 Yokosuka Navy Type 96 Carrier Attack Bomber
 Yokosuka Navy Type 96 Transport
 Yokosuka Navy Type 99 Bomber Trainer Myojo Model 22
 Yokosuka Navy Type 99 Flying boat
 Yokosuka Navy Bomber Ginga
 Yokosuka Navy Carrier Bomber Suisei
 Yokosuka Navy Experimental 9-shi Carrier Attack Bomber
 Yokosuka Navy Experimental 9-shi Flying Boat
 Yokosuka Navy Experimental 13-shi Carrier Bomber Suisei
 Yokosuka Navy Experimental 15-Shi Night Fighter Byakko
 Yokosuka Navy Experimental 15-Shi Night Fighter Kyokko
 Yokosuka Navy Experimental 17-Shi Carrier Reconnaissance Aircraft Seiun
 Yokosuka Navy Experimental 17-Shi Land Reconnaissance Aircraft Gyo-un
 Yokosuka Navy Experimental 18-Shi Reconnaissance Aircraft Keiun
 Yokosuka Navy Experimental Ente-type Glider
 Yokosuka Navy Experimental Reconnaissance Aircraft Keiun Kai
 Yokosuka Navy Experimental Test Aircraft
 Yokosuka Navy Experimental Target Glider
 Yokosuka Navy Experimental Trainer Shuka
 Yokosuka Navy Experimental Training Glider Akigusa
 Yokosuka Navy Experimental Transport Glider
 Yokosuka Navy Jet Bomber Tenga
 Navy Special Attacker Ohka

Yomiuri
Itogawa Eizo and Horikoshi Jiro sponsored by Yomiuri Shimbun, Japan
 Yomiuri Y-1

Yordanov (aircraft designer) 
 Yordanov A-1

York 
(Leon York, Midland, Texas, United States.)
 York June Bug
 York Y-2

York 
(C.H. York)
 XHC-22 Yorkopter

Young 
(Ed Young)
 Young Skyheater

Young 
(J J Young, Oklahoma City, OK)
 Young 1922 Helicopter

Young 
(Lewis G. Young, New Jersey)
 Young 1916 Taube
 Young Gull Wing monoplane

Young 
(Richard E Young, Ypsilanti, MI)
 Young Model A
 Young Special

Youngcopter
(Björn Jung )
 Youngcopter Neo

Youngman-Baynes 
 Youngman-Baynes High Lift

Younkin-Dake 
 Younkin-Dake Mullicoupe

Yue 
(Fong Yue (also seen as Fung Joe Guey and Feng Ru), Oakland, CA)
 Yue 1909 No.1
 Yue 1909 No.2

Yuneec International 
 Yuneec International E430
 Yuneec International EPac
 Yuneec International EViva
 Yuneec International ESpyder
 Yuneec International ETrike

Yunker 
((George C) Yunker Aircraft Co, 115 Osage St, Wichita, KS)
 Yunker Y-1
 Yunker Y-2

Yunshuji 
 Yunshuji-1

Yutz 
(Joe Yutz, Pottsville, PA)
 Yutz Parasol

References

Further reading

External links

 List of aircraft (Y)